This article presents a list of the historical events and publications of Australian literature during 2007.

Events
Surrender by Sonya Hartnett, and The Book Thief by Markus Zusak are named as Honor Books in the 2007 American Library Association's Michael L. Printz Award for Excellence in Young Adult Literature.
"The Guardian" newspaper from the UK reports that Borders plans to sell its Australian stores.
The small township of Clunes, about 20 kilometres north of Ballarat in Victoria, decides to try to set up Australia's first dedicated booktown. The first weekend event takes place on 20 May.
AustLit (www.austlit.edu.au), the major Australian literature resource for research and teaching housed at the University of Queensland, announces the commencement of "Black Words", a literary website specialising in Australian Indigenous writers and storytellers and their works.
Federal Education minister, Julie Bishop, announces that the Australian Government will allocate funds to A$1.5m to create a Chair of Australian Literature in an Australian university.
Charlie Rimmer, Group Commercial Manager for Angus and Robertson bookshops, writes to a number of Australian independent publishers indicating that the bookshop chain will refuse to stock their books without compensation.
Lonely Planet, the iconic Australian publisher of travel guides, is sold to the commercial division of the BBC in a deal reportedly worth A$200 million.
Australia's new Prime Minister, Kevin Rudd, announces a major new literary prize of $100,000 in both fiction and non-fiction categories.
Australia-Asia Literary Award established.

Major publications

Literary fiction

 David Brooks – The Fern Tattoo
 Steven Carroll – The Time We Have Taken
 Belinda Castles – The River Baptists
 Jon Cleary – Four-Cornered Circle
 J. M. Coetzee – Diary of a Bad Year
 Matthew Condon – The Trout Opera
 Steven Conte – The Zookeeper's War
 Gregory Day – Ron McCoy's Sea of Diamonds
 Michelle de Kretser – The Lost Dog
 Nicholas Drayson – Love and the Platypus
 Karen Foxlee – The Anatomy of Wings
 Rodney Hall – Love Without Hope
 Janette Turner Hospital – Orpheus Lost
 Gail Jones – Sorry
 Mireille Juchau – Burning In
 Thomas Keneally – The Widow and Her Hero
 Malcolm Knox – Jamaica
 Christopher Koch – The Memory Room
 Colleen McCullough – Antony and Cleopatra
 Carol Lefevre – Nights in the Asylum
 Rhyll McMaster – Feather Man
 David Malouf – The Complete Stories
 Alex Miller – Landscape of Farewell
 Nicholas Shakespeare – Secrets of the Sea
 Charlotte Wood – The Children
 Jessica White – A Curious Intimacy
 Geraldine Wooller – The Seamstress

Children's and Young Adult fiction
 Alexandra Adornetto – The Shadow Thief
 Sherryl Clark – Sixth Grade Style Queen (Not!), illus by Elissa Christian
 Mem Fox – Where the Giant Sleeps
 Jackie French
 Pharaoh: The Boy Who Conquered the Nile
 The Shaggy Gully Times, illus by Bruce Whatley
 Scot Gardner – Gravity
 Sonya Hartnett – The Ghost's Child
 John Heffernan – Marty's Shadow
 Odo Hirsch – Amelia Dee and the Peacock Lamp
 Simmone Howell – Notes from the Teenage Underground
 Justine Larbalestier – Magic's Child
 Brigid Lowry – Tomorrow All Will Be Beautiful
 Meme McDonald – Love Like Water
 David Metzenthen
 Black Water
 Winning the World Cup, illus by Stephen Axelsen
 Garth Nix – Lady Friday
 Leonie Norrington – Leaving Barrumbi
 Emily Rodda – The Key to Rondo
 Scott Westerfeld – Extras
 Carole Wilkinson – Dragon Moon
 Sean Williams – The Changeling

Crime and Mystery
 Mark Abernethy – Golden Serpent
 Robert G. Barrett – The Tesla Legacy
 John Clanchy and Mark Henshaw (J.M. Calder) – And Hope to Die
 Garry Disher – Chain of Evidence
 Kathryn Fox – Skin and Bone
 Robert Gott – Amongst the Dead
 Kerry Greenwood – Trick or Treat
 Jarad Henry – Blood Sunset
 Sarah Hopkins – The Crimes of Billy Fish
 Katherine Howell – Frantic
 Gabrielle Lord – Shattered
 Shane Maloney – Sucked In
 PD Martin – Fan Mail
 Dorothy Porter – El Dorado
 Leigh Redhead – Cherry Pie
 Michael Robotham – The Night Ferry
 Steve Toltz – A Fraction of the Whole
 Chris Womersley – The Low Road

Romance
 Anna Campbell – Claiming the Courtesan
 Emma Darcy – The Billionaire's Scandalous Marriage
 Lilian Darcy – Cafe du Jour
 Kimberley Freeman – Duet
 Anna Jacobs – Tomorrow's Princess
 Melanie La'Brooy – Serendipity
 Tamara McKinley – Lands Beyond the Sea

Science Fiction and Fantasy
 David Conyers & John Sunseri – The Spiraling Worm
 Marianne de Pierres – Dark Space
 Sara Douglass – The Serpent Bride
 Lian Hearn – Heaven's Net is Wide
 Jack Heath – Remote Control 
 David Kowalski – The Company of the Dead
 Karen Miller – The Riven Kingdom
 Jason Nahrung & Mil Clayton – The Darkness Within
 Ben Peek – Black Sheep: A Dystopian Novel
 Sean Williams – Saturn Returns

Drama
 Stephen Carleton – The Narcissist
 Michael Gow – Toy Symphony
 Katherine Thomson – King Tide
 Alana Valentine – Parramatta Girls

Poetry
Judith Bishop – Event
 David Brooks – Urban Elegies, Sydney: Island Press (Australia)
Lisa Gorton – Press Release
 Kathryn Lomer – Two Kinds of Silence, University of Queensland Press, 
 David Malouf – Typewriter Music, winner of the 2008 Arts Queensland Judith Wright Calanthe Award
 Dorothy Porter – El Dorado
 Peter Rose – The Best Australian Poems 2007, Black Inc., 
 Peter Skrzynecki – Old/New World, University of Queensland Press, 
 Petra White – The Incoming Tide

Non-fiction
 Janet Fife-Yeomans – Killing Jodie
 Tom Griffiths – Slicing the Silence: Voyaging to Antarctica
 Clive James – Cultural Amnesia: Notes in the Margin of My Time
 Philip Jones – Ochre and Rust: Artefacts and Encounters on Australian Frontiers
 Evan McHugh – Red Centre, Dark Heart
 Nicolas Rothwell – Another Country
 John Silvester and Andrew Rule – Underbelly: The Gangland War

Biographies
 Philip Dwyer – Napoleon: The Path To Power 1769–1799
 Kim Huynh – Where the Sea Takes Us
 Mark Kurzem – The Mascot
 Brenda Niall – Life Class: The Education of a Biographer
 Craig Sherborne – Muck
 Jeff Sparrow – Communism: A Love Story

Awards and honours

Lifetime achievement

Fiction

International

National

Children and Young Adult

International

National

Crime and Mystery

International

National

Science Fiction

Non-Fiction

Poetry

Drama

Deaths
 1 February – Elizabeth Jolley, author (born 1923)
 22 February – Joyce Lee, poet (born 1913)
 2 March – David A. Myers, poet and publisher (born 1942)
 23 May – John Croyston, poet (born 1933)
 11 July – Glenda Adams, author (born 1939)
 11 July – Noel Rowe, poet (born 1951)
 1 August – Mona Brand, playwright (born 1915)
 24 August – Philip Grundy, translator (born 1932)
 16 October – Steve J. Spears, author and playwright (born 1951)
 31 October – Eric Rolls, author (born 1923)
 24 December – Jan McKemmish, author (born 1950)

See also
 2007 in Australia
 2007 in literature
 2007 in poetry
 List of years in literature
 List of years in Australian literature
 List of Australian literary awards

References

Note: all references relating to awards can, or should be, found on the relevant award's page.

Literature
Australian literature by year
21st-century Australian literature
2007 in literature